Belogorsky is a rural locality (a khutor) in Rossoshinskoye Rural Settlement, Uryupinsky District, Volgograd Oblast, Russia. The population was 160 as of 2010. There are 4 streets.

Geography 
Belogorsky is located in steppe, on the right bank of the Khopyor River, 43 km southwest of Uryupinsk (the district's administrative centre) by road. Tepikinskaya is the nearest rural locality.

References 

Rural localities in Uryupinsky District